Sonnenborgh can refer to:
 Sonnenborgh Observatory, Utrecht, the Netherlands
 Minor planet Sonnenborgh named after the Sonnenborgh Observatory